Central Sumatra was a province in Indonesia whose territories included present day West Sumatra, Riau, Jambi, and the Riau Islands. Since 1957 this province has not been registered as an Indonesian province after it was dissolved by Emergency Law No 19/1957 and divided into the provinces of West Sumatra, Riau and Jambi through Law No 61/1958 by the Sukarno government.

History

Establishment
After the Indonesian independence, in the first session of the Regional National Committee (KND), the Province of Sumatra was then divided into three sub-provinces, namely: North Sumatra, Central Sumatra, and South Sumatra. Central Sumatra Province itself was an amalgamation of three administrative regions called residencies, namely: Riau Residency, West Sumatra Residency, and Jambi Residency.

With the issuance of the Law No 10/1948 on 15 April 1948, it was stipulated that Sumatra was divided into three provinces, each of which had the right to regulate and manage its own household, namely: North Sumatra Province, Central Sumatra Province, and South Sumatra Province. 15 April 1948 was later designated as the anniversary of the Province of Central Sumatra.

Dissolved
Emergency Law No 19/1957 on the Establishment of Level I Regions of West Sumatra, Jambi and Riau was ratified on 9 August 1957 and took effect on 10 August 1957. This law was made in order to take into account in the development of the state administration and to carry out the government's efforts to establish an autonomous region. With the enactment of the Emergency Law No 19/1957, the Government Regulation in Lieu of Law (Perppu) No 4/1950 on the establishment of the Province of Central Sumatra was revoked, and separate provinces of Riau, West Sumatra and Jambi were created.

Governor
The province of Central Sumatra was governed by a governor, this is a list of former governors of Central Sumatra from 1948 to 1956.

References

Former provinces of Indonesia